Michael Robert Porter (born 19 May 1945) is an English former footballer who played 14 games at inside-forward for Port Vale between 1964 and 1965.

Career
Porter graduated through the Port Vale youth system to sign professional forms under manager Freddie Steele in July 1962. He made his debut in a goalless draw with Barnsley at Oakwell on 20 April 1964, in the penultimate game of the 1963–64 season. Porter scored his first goal for the "Valiants" on 28 September 1964, in a 2–2 draw with Mansfield Town at Field Mill. He hit his second goal on 21 November, in a 2–0 win at Barnsley. However the club were relegated out of the Third Division at the end of the 1964–65 season, and with 14 league and cup appearances to his name, Porter was handed a free transfer in April 1965 by manager Jackie Mudie, and moved on to Portmadoc, and later Oswestry Town.

Career statistics
Source:

References

Footballers from Stoke-on-Trent
English footballers
Association football forwards
Port Vale F.C. players
Oswestry Town F.C. players
English Football League players
1945 births
Living people